Sereno W. Graves (October 11, 1810 – February 13, 1899) was a member of the Wisconsin State Assembly.

Graves was born in Berkshire, Vermont. He was a colonel in the Vermont state militia in 1836. He married Malindy Blakerly in 1841; she died the same year. He married Melvina Dennison in 1843.  He moved to Rutland, Wisconsin, in 1844. He and his second wife had a son before her death in 1845. In 1846, Graves married Mary R. Dudley.  They had five children. He was a Baptist. He died in Evansville, Wisconsin in 1899.

His former home, now known as the Sereno W. Graves House, is listed on the National Register of Historic Places. The Samuel Hunt House, the Daniel Pond Farmhouse and the Lockwood Barn, all of which Graves also designed, are also listed.

Career
Graves was a member of the Assembly in 1861 and a candidate for the Wisconsin State Senate in 1875. In addition, he was Clerk and Assessor of Rutland, Surveyor of Dane County, Wisconsin and a justice of the peace. He was a Republican.

References

People from Berkshire, Vermont
People from Dane County, Wisconsin
Republican Party members of the Wisconsin State Assembly
City and town clerks
American surveyors
American justices of the peace
1810 births
1899 deaths
19th-century American politicians
19th-century American judges